Returning Valiant was a pro-independence revolutionary group in Hong Kong. Formed mainly by students under the Hong Kong national security law in 2020, the group called for continuation of the revolution to liberate the city.

After the first arrest in May 2021, the police declared to have dismantled the group in July, arresting members of the group for plotting "terrorist attacks" in the city. Seven members, including the founder, pleaded guilty to subversion under the security law, and were sent to correctional centres or given 5-year jail term.

Aims 
With the decline of the large-scale protests in 2020 following the coronavirus pandemic and the imposition of Hong Kong national security law, Returning Valiant hoped to "adhere the aspirations of sages, keep the spark of revolution", with the target of "mind enlightenment and liberation of our city".

Returning Valiant consisted of 20 members who referred to the group as "the embers of revolution".

History 

Returning Valiant had set up street booths on 31 January 2021, sharing the history of uprisings across the world. Members were fined under group gathering ban, and were warned of breaching the security law.

On 5 May 2021, four students (Lai Chun-hei, Yuen Ka-him, Chan Ching-hing, Choi Wing-kit) were reportedly arrested on location after sneaking into Po Leung Kuk Laws Foundation College, a secondary school in Tseung Kwan O. Police, during the search, discovered some suspects belonged to Returning Valiant and hid independence slogans and banners at home, including former spokesman Yuen Ka-him. All were charged with housebreaking later and bailed out. The national security police (NSD) arrested a total of seven individuals on 5 and 6 May, five were accused of subversion but were not indicted.

On 5 July 2021, nine members of Returning Valiant were arrested for alleged terrorist activities, six of whom were secondary school students. The NSD said the arrested had attempted to plant car bombs, attack cross-harbour tunnels, railways, court buildings, and public facilities across the city, using TATP; in a raid at a hostel in Tsim Sha Tsui, police had confiscated laboratory equipment for making that highly explosive substance. Three (Ho Yu-wang, Alexander Au Man, Chan Cheuk-hin) were charged, brought to court, and denied bail on 7 July. Others were granted bail by police. Five more were arrested on 12 July, and three (Kwok Man-hei, Chan Hoi-leung, Law Kai-wing) were charged on 14 July; they were remanded in custody, with their trial adjourned to 1 September. One more person (So Wing-ching) was charged with terrorist activities on 1 September.

On 28 September 2021, seven were arrested by the NSD and charged with conspiracy to incite subversion of state power. At least 22 arrests had been made in relation to the case by the end of 2021.

The NSD arrested a 22-year-old man on suspicion of five charges: terrorism, arson, conspiracy to commit arson, conspiracy to defraud, and money laundering on 26 October 2022. Believed to be a member of Returning Valiant and another anti-government group Black Bloc and suspected of providing financial support, he was accused of committing arson at a Tsuen Wan COVID-19 testing station in May 2021, planning to carry out an arson attack on a COVID-19 testing centre, and defrauding a bank.

Trial 

Members of Returning Valiant were charged with conspiracy to incite subversion or conspiracy to plan terrorist activities, with one defendant facing both charges. All defendants remanded in custody as bail application denied by court or did not submit so, except a 16-year-old boy who was granted bail before sentencing, and 24-year-old Chan Hoi-leung.

Subversion 
All seven defendants pleaded guilty to inciting subversion, including four minors aged under 18. The prosecutor, Stella Lo, argued that leaflets written by the defendants had mentioned the Ukrainian Revolution, French Revolution, and words from Mao Zedong on revolution. They were accused of calling for the overthrow of the government and violent struggle against authorities through live videos and online press conferences.

On 8 October 2022, five young defendants, including four minors, were sentenced to up to three years at the training centre by Kwok Wai-kin, national security judge. Kwok said that "Even if one person is incited, Hong Kong's stability and residents' safety could have been greatly harmed", and claimed that their message could have turned peaceful protestors violent, even though he agreed there was no direct evidence of anyone doing that.

The United Nations Human Rights Office said it was "alarmed" by the sentencing of minors to correctional facility. The Office regretted the "continued application of the national security law, including against children, in spite of the clear recommendations of the Human Rights Committee", and urged the Hong Kong authorities too bring the legislation fully into compliance with international human rights obligations.

On 9 February 2023, Choi Wing-kit, founder of Returning Valiant who faced additional charge of possessing offensive weapons, and Chan Yau-tsun were sentenced to jail. While both had not been charged for actual subversion but only conspiracy, Kwok determined that the offences were of a "serious" nature and sentenced Chan to five years, the minimum mandated under the NSL, while Choi was sentenced to five years and three months, with the increment due to two retractable batons that had been found at his home. Both had pleaded guilty.

Terrorism 
On 16 December 2022, a bail application of Law Kai-wing was rejected.

No date for trial is set for this case as of February 2023.

References 

Student organisations in Hong Kong
Political organisations based in Hong Kong